Agaricus urinascens is a species of mushroom-forming fungus in the family Agaricaceae. It is edible and distributed throughout Europe.

References

urinascens
Edible fungi
Fungi of Europe